Turk or The Turk is a nickname for:

 Turk Broda (Walter Edward Broda, 1914–72), a Canadian hockey player
 Turk Edwards (Albert Glen Edwards, 1907–1973), American professional football player
 Turk Lown (Omar Joseph Lown, 1924–2016), American baseball player
 Turk McBride (Claude Maurice McBride, born 1985), American football player
 Turk Murphy (Melvin Edward Alton Murphy, 1915–1987), trombonist and bandleader
 Turk (rapper) (Tab Virgil Jr., born 1981), an American rapper
 Carolina Duer (born 1978), known as "The Turk", Argentine world champion boxer
 Gerard Gallant (born September 2, 1963), nicknamed “Turk”, Canadian ice hockey coach and former player
 Derek Sanderson (born 1946), nicknamed "Turk", Canadian hockey player
 Philippe Liégeois (born 1947), pen name "Turk", a Belgian comic book artist
 Raymond Westerling (1919–87), nicknamed "The Turk", a Dutch officer who attempted a coup in Indonesia

See also
 Turk (disambiguation)
 Turk (surname)
 El Turco (Spanish, 'The Turk'), a list of people with the nickname
 Faymonville, Belgium, whose inhabitants are nicknamed Turks
 Llanelli, Wales, whose inhabitants are nicknamed Turks
 Louis William, Margrave of Baden-Baden (1655–1707), known as Türkenlouis ('Turkish Louis')

Lists of people by nickname